The alupag is a fruit of the Dimocarpus malesianus tree found in Indochina and Malaysia.  Compared to a longan, it has bumpier skin. The tree's wood is used to make combs.

Description
Tree with brown twigs. Leaves acute to acuminate with a sunken mid rib, tomentose on the bottom. Petioles and rachis tomentose, petals well developed

References

Dimocarpus